The American Heiress is a 1917 British silent crime film directed by Cecil M. Hepworth and starring Alma Taylor, Violet Hopson and Stewart Rome.

Cast
 Alma Taylor as Bessie  
 Violet Hopson as Cynthia Hunks 
 Stewart Rome as Parker  
 Lionelle Howard as Bob Summers 
 John MacAndrews as Viper Smith  
 Johnny Butt as Sir John Higgins

References

Bibliography
 Wintour, Barry. Britain and the Great War, 1914-1918: A Subject Bibliography of Some Selected Aspects. Greenengle publishing, 2014.

External links

1917 films
1917 crime films
British crime films
British silent short films
1917 short films
Films directed by Cecil Hepworth
Films set in England
Hepworth Pictures films
British black-and-white films
1910s English-language films
1910s British films